Malaysian Canadians are Canadian citizens who are of Malaysian descent. The 2016 Canada Census recorded 16,920 people self-identifying as Malaysian Canadian or of at least some Malaysian descent, but only 1 820 of these self-identified as solely Malaysian Canadian. Earlier Canada 2001 Census recorded 20,420 first-generation Malaysian Canadians, 8,660 of whom lived in Ontario.

Notable Malaysian Canadians
 Canadian prime minister Justin Trudeau claims to be of Malaysian descent, through the parent of William Farquhar's wife.
 Yuen Pau Woo, member of the Senate of Canada
 Osric Chau, actor

See also

Asian Canadians

References

Malaysian Canadian

Asian Canadian
Canadian
Immigration to Canada